The Rear-Admiral Eustațiu Sebastian-class corvette (also known as the Tetal-II or Modified Tetal class by NATO) is a series of two corvettes used by the Romanian Naval Forces for Black Sea duty. They have a displacement of 1,385 tonnes, a helicopter aft, and as main armament a 76 mm gun, torpedo tubes and anti-submarine warfare rocket launchers.

These ships are updated versions of the Admiral Petre Bărbuneanu (Tetal-I)-class corvette.

Ships
 Contraamiral Eustațiu Sebastian  (F-264) Launched 1988 – In service
 Contraamiral Horia Macellariu  (F-265) – Launched 1991 – In service

Two other ships were laid down, but never finished.  They are now awaiting disposal in Mangalia military harbor.

See also
Romanian Naval Forces

References

 Baker, A.D. The Naval Institute Guide to Combat Fleets of the World 1998–1999. Annapolis, Maryland, USA: Naval Institute Press, 1998. .

External links
 Romanian Navy
World Navies Today

Corvettes of the Romanian Naval Forces
Corvette classes